Central European Summer Time (CEST), sometimes referred to as Central European Daylight Time (CEDT), is the standard clock time observed during the period of summer daylight-saving in those European countries which observe Central European Time (CET; UTC+01:00) during the other part of the year. It corresponds to UTC+02:00, which makes it the same as Eastern European Time, Central Africa Time, South African Standard Time, Egypt Standard Time and Kaliningrad Time in Russia.

Names
Other names which have been applied to Central European Summer Time are Middle European Summer Time (MEST), Central European Daylight Saving Time (CEDT), and Bravo Time (after the second letter of the NATO phonetic alphabet).

Period of observation
Since 1996, European Summer Time has been observed between 01:00 UTC (02:00 CET and 03:00 CEST) on the last Sunday of March, and 01:00 UTC on the last Sunday of October; previously the rules were not uniform across the European Union.

There were proposals to abandon summer time in Europe from 2021, possibly by moving winter time up by an hour and keeping that time through the year.

Usage
The following countries and territories regularly use Central European Summer Time:
 Albania, since 1974
 Andorra, since 1985
 Austria, since 1980
 Belgium, since 1980
 Bosnia and Herzegovina, since 1983
 Croatia, since 1983
 Czech Republic, since 1979
 Denmark (metropolitan), since 1980
 France (metropolitan), since 1976
 Germany, since 1980
 Gibraltar, since 1982
 Hungary, since 1980
 Italy, since 1968
 Kosovo, since 1983
 Liechtenstein, since 1981
 Luxembourg, since 1981
 Malta, since 1974
 Monaco, since 1976
 Montenegro, since 1983
 Netherlands, since 1977
 North Macedonia, since 1983
 Norway, since 1980
 Poland, since 1977
 San Marino, since 1966
 Serbia, since 1983
 Slovakia, since 1979
 Slovenia, since 1983
 Spain, since 1974 (except Canary Islands, which instead apply Western European Summer Time)
 Sweden, since 1980
 Switzerland, since 1981
 Vatican, since 1966

The following countries have also used Central European Summer Time in the past:
 Libya, 1951–1959, 1982–1989, 1996–1997, 2012–2013
 Lithuania, 1998–1999
 Portugal, 1993–1995
 Tunisia, 2005–2008

See also
 European Summer Time
 Time zone

References

Time zones
Daylight saving time
Time in Europe
Geography of Central Europe